Conium divaricatum is a species of flowering plant in the family Apiaceae, native to Greece, including Crete. It was first described in 1856.

References

Apioideae
Flora of Crete
Flora of Greece
Plants described in 1856